Mount Head is a  mountain summit located in Alberta, Canada.

Description
Precipitation runoff from the mountain drains into tributaries of the Highwood River. The mountain can be seen from Highway 40 and Highway 541.

History
The mountain was named in 1859 by John Palliser to honor Edmund Walker Head (1805–1868), the Governor General of the Province of Canada who had provided support for the Palliser expedition. The mountain's toponym was officially adopted March 31, 1924, by the Geographical Names Board of Canada.

The first ascent of the summit was made in 1934 by Raymond M. Patterson. The peak immediately northwest of Mt. Head on the opposite side of Head Creek is officially named "Patterson's Peak" in his honor.

Geology
Mount Head was created during the Lewis Overthrust. The peak is underlain by folded and thrust-faulted sedimentary rock laid down during the Mesozoic and Paleozoic eras. Formed in shallow seas, this sedimentary rock was pushed east and over the top of younger rock during the Laramide orogeny. The Mount Head Formation formed during the Viséan age.

Climate

Based on the Köppen climate classification, Mount Head is located in a subarctic climate zone with cold, snowy winters, and mild summers. Winter temperatures can drop below −20 °C with wind chill factors below −30 °C. The months June through September offer the most favorable weather to climb or view Mount Head.

See also
 Kananaskis Country
 Geography of Alberta

Gallery

References

External links
 Mount Head: weather forecast
 Mt. Head (photo): Flickr

Two-thousanders of Alberta
Canadian Rockies
Alberta's Rockies